The "Doc" Thomas House is a national historic site located at 5530 Sunset Dr., just east of South Miami, Florida in Miami-Dade County. Completed in 1932, it was the residence of Arden Hayes Thomas, who had moved to Dade County from Indiana to open a drug store in the 1920s.

Thomas deeded the house and almost 2.2 acres of wooded property to Tropical Audubon Society in 1974.  After his death on December 31, 1975, Tropical Audubon Society acquired the property; it has served as the organization's headquarters and a community resource since April, 1976. It was added to the National Register of Historic Places on June 13, 2014.

References

National Register of Historic Places in Miami-Dade County, Florida
Houses on the National Register of Historic Places in Florida
Houses in Miami-Dade County, Florida